Álvaro Mercado (born 18 October 1964) is a Colombian boxer. He competed in the men's flyweight event at the 1984 Summer Olympics.

References

1964 births
Living people
Colombian male boxers
Olympic boxers of Colombia
Boxers at the 1984 Summer Olympics
Sportspeople from Barranquilla
Flyweight boxers